Shady Plain is an unincorporated community located within Kiskiminetas Township, Armstrong County, Pennsylvania, United States.

References

Unincorporated communities in Armstrong County, Pennsylvania
Unincorporated communities in Pennsylvania